Sakari Jyrki Kuosmanen (born 6 September 1956) is a Finnish singer and actor, born in Helsinki. He has recorded several solo albums and has also done work with Sleepy Sleepers and Leningrad Cowboys. 
He appeared as himself on the Finnish television series Aaken ja Sakun kesäkeittiö in 1999.

Discography

Albums 
 Sakari Kuosmanen (1985)
 Ihana elämä (1986)
 Suuri onni (1989)
 Kuu ja Kulkija (1995)
 Yön katseessasi (1999)
 Onnen lyhteitä (2001)
 Pieni sydän (2002)
 Entä jos... (2003)

Filmography 
 Calamari Union (1985)
 Rocky VI (1986)
 Varjoja paratiisissa (1986)
 Thru the Wire (1987)
 Macbeth (1987)
 Helsinki Napoli All Night Long (1987)
 Ariel (1988)
 Cha Cha Cha (1989)
 Leningrad Cowboys Go America (1989)
 Night on Earth (1991)
 Iron Horsemen (1995)
 Drifting Clouds (Kauas pilvet karkaavat, 1996)
 Sen täytyy tapahtua (1999)
 Juha (1999)
 The Man Without a Past (Mies vailla menneisyyttä, 2002)
 Pearls and Pigs (Helmiä ja sikoja, 2003)
 The Other Side of Hope (Toivon tuolla puolen, 2017)

External links 
 Sakari Kuosmanen's homepage on EMI website

1956 births
Living people
Singers from Helsinki
20th-century Finnish male singers
Male actors from Helsinki